Andbank is a universal bank based in Andorra providing retail, private and corporate banking services in Andorra and internationally.

History
Andbank was created in August 2001 as a result of the merger between Banc Agrícol i Comercial d’Andorra (that was founded in 1930) and Banca Reig (founded in 1956).

Organizational structure
The firm is privately owned by the Cerqueda and Ribas families. It is directed by a team of independent professionals.

Andbank’s Board of Directors is composed of the following individuals:
Oscar Ribas Reig, Honorary Chairman
Manuel Cerqueda Donadeu, Chairman
Oriol Ribas Duró, Deputy
German Castejón Fernández, Director
Manuel Cerqueda Diez, Director representing Cerqueda Donadeu, S.A.
Jorge Maortua, Director representing Reig Finances S.A.U.
Manuel Ros Gener, Director
Xavier Santamaria Mas, Director
Jaume Serra Serra, Director
Josep Vicens Torradas, Director representing Inversion, Gestions i Estudis, S.A.U.
Jacobo Baltar García Peñuela, Secretary General
Ricard Tubau Roca, CEO

Subsidiaries
Andbank has a network of forty subsidiaries in Europe, America, and Asia, including:

Andbank Monaco SAM (Monaco)
Andbank Luxembourg S.A. (Luxembourg)
Andbanc Wealth Management, LLC (Miami, United States)
Andbanc Brokerage, LLC (Miami, United States)
Andbanc Advisory, LLC (Miami, United States)
Andbank (Panamá) S.A. (Panama)
Andbank (Bahamas) Limited (Bahamas)
AND PB Financial Services, S.A. (Uruguay)
Quest Capital Advisers Agente de Valores, S.A. (Uruguay)
Columbus de Mexico, S.A. de CV (Mexico)
Banco Andbank (Brasil), S.A. (Brazil)
Andbank España S.A.U. (Spain)
Andbank Wealth Management SGIIC S.A.U. (Spain)
Medpatrimonia Invest S.L. (Spain)
Sigma Portfolio Management (Israel)

See also 

List of banks in Andorra

References

External links 
 Associació de Bancs Andorrans (ABA) (Association of Andorran Banks)
 Institut Nacional Andorrà de Finances (INAF) (Andorran National Institute of Finances) 
 Andbank at AndorraPartner

Banks of Andorra
Banks established in 1930
1930 establishments in Andorra